The Commander of the Croatian Navy is the official head of the Croatian Navy. Ivo Raffanelli is the current commander and was appointed in 2018.

List of commanders

References

Croatian Navy
Military of Croatia
Croatia